The Einstein of Sex (also known as: The Einstein of Sex - Life and Work of Dr. M. Hirschfeld, German title: Der Einstein des Sex) is a 1999 German film directed by Rosa von Praunheim.

The film was shown at the Berlin International Film Festival and at the São Paulo International Film Festival in 2000, among others.

Plot
Rosa von Praunheim portrays a historical personality. Magnus Hirschfeld made a name for himself as a co-founder of sexology and a pioneer of the gay movement. In his Institut für Sexualwissenschaft in Berlin he fights for the impunity of homosexuality. In the 1930s he even gave lectures in the USA, but the Nazis condemned his educational work. His own homosexuality keeps getting him into trouble, too. When Hirschfeld finally went into exile in France, the Nazis destroyed his institute in Berlin.

Awards
 1999: Nomination for the Golden Leopard at the Locarno Festival

Reception
The German magazine Spiegel wrote: "Rapid rise and early suffering, political furor and private disaster, told in a pleasingly conventional way against the political background of the Weimar Republic - a cinematic poetry album of upright feelings."

Notes

External links

1999 films
1990s biographical films
1999 LGBT-related films
German biographical films
Films directed by Rosa von Praunheim
Magnus Hirschfeld
Films set in Berlin
Gay-related films
Transgender-related films
Films set in the 1890s
Films set in the 1900s
Films set in the 1910s
Films set in the 1920s
Films set in the 1930s
Biographical films about physicians
German LGBT-related films
Biographical films about LGBT people
1990s German films